Riley Bullough (born November 23, 1993) is a former American football linebacker. He played college football at Michigan State, and was signed by the Tampa Bay Buccaneers as an undrafted free agent in 2017.

College career
Bullough played four seasons for the Spartans, appearing in 50 games. Over the course of his career, he  recorded 214 tackles, 18 tackles for loss, and 7.5 sacks along with 4 interceptions, forced 2 fumbles and 3 fumble recoveries. He was named to the All-Big Ten second-team as a junior and the All-Big Ten third-team as a senior.

Professional career

Tampa Bay Buccaneers
Bullough signed with the Tampa Bay Buccaneers as an undrafted free agent on May 1, 2017. He was waived on September 2, 2017 and was signed to the Buccaneers' practice squad the next day. He was promoted to the active roster on December 12, 2017.

On September 1, 2018, Bullough was placed on injured reserve. On September 11, 2018, Bullough was waived by the Buccaneers with an injury settlement. He was re-signed to the active roster on October 22, 2018. He appeared in nine games for the Buccaneers, starting three, with 14 tackles and a pass defended in 2018.

On April 29, 2019, Bullough was waived by the Buccaneers.

Tennessee Titans
On April 30, 2019, Bullough was claimed off waivers by the Tennessee Titans. He was waived/injured on August 10, 2019 and placed on injured reserve. He was released on August 20.

Bullough announced his retirement from professional football in December of 2019.

Personal life
Bullough's parents are Shane and LeeAnn Bullough. His father was a linebacker at Michigan State from 1983–1986. He has two brothers, Max and Byron. Max previously played with the Houston Texans and Byron played for the Spartans.

References

External links
Tampa Bay Buccaneers bio

1993 births
Living people
American football linebackers
Michigan State Spartans football players
Players of American football from Michigan
Sportspeople from Traverse City, Michigan
Tampa Bay Buccaneers players
Tennessee Titans players